Aulotrachichthys heptalepis, also known as the Hawaiian luminous roughy, is a slimehead fish found in the Hawaiian Islands south of Niihau, the westernmost island. It was first described in 1984 after 33 individuals were caught by the U.S. National Marine Fisheries Service in a series of cruises of the Hawaiian Islands.

References

External links
 

heptalepis
Fish described in 1984
Fish of Hawaii
Fish of the Pacific Ocean